The Ministry of State Security of the Democratic People's Republic of Korea (Korean: 조선민주주의인민공화국 국가보위성) is the secret police agency of North Korea.  It is an autonomous agency of the North Korean government reporting directly to the Supreme Leader. In addition to its internal security duties, it is involved in the operation of North Korea's concentration camps and various other hidden activities. The agency is reputed to be one of the most brutal secret police forces in the world, and has been involved in numerous human rights abuses.

It is one of two agencies which provides security or protection to North Korean officials and VIPs alongside the Supreme Guard Command.

History
In 1945, the DPRK Security was established, being attached to the "Police Department". In 1948, it became Ministry of Internal Affairs with the Bureau of Political Protection attached. In February 1949, it became the Political Security Agency. On September 12, 1949, Bowman Lee Chang-ok, a violent man, was purged and reorganized and absorbed into social safety.
In September 1948, the National Political Affairs Department, which specializes in political prisoners in the North Korean region, was newly established.

On August 20, 1949, however, after Lee Chang-ok, the deputy secretary of the Republic of Korea, escaped from Haeju, South Korea, along with Kim Kang and others, the organization was abolished after a massive purge. It was integrated into the Ministry of Social Safety (later known as the Ministry of People's Security). In 1951 it was renamed to Social Security Political Security Agency. In 1952, Department of Homeland Security. In 1962, it became Social and Political Security Agency. The SSD was created in 1973, being separated from the Ministry of Public Security.

Some defectors and sources have suggested that unlike its Eastern Bloc counterparts, State Security functions are actually conducted by several larger and different security bodies that operate under the Workers' Party of Korea (WPK) or the Korean People's Army (KPA, the North Korean armed forces), each with its own unique responsibilities and classified names that are referred to by code (e.g. Room 39), and that the agency is little more than a hollow shell used by the elite to coordinate their activities and provide cover for them.

The post of Security Department head was left vacant after Minister Ri Chun-su's death in 1987, although it was de facto if not de jure controlled by Kim Jong-il and the WPK Organization and Guidance Department he headed. In 1998, the SSD migrated under the National Defence Commission, also chaired by Kim Jong-il. Finally, in 2007, it was transferred under the WPK Administration Department, whose first vice director became responsible of the SSD daily work, but it continued to have obligations towards the Organization and Guidance Department.

In November 2011, it was reported that General U Tong-chuk had been appointed permanent minister of State Security, the first of this kind since 1987, filling a post left unoccupied for 24 years. This was almost concurrent with General Ri Myong-su's appointment as minister of People's Security. Other sources also claimed that Kim Jong-un worked at the State Security Department before and/or after his anointment as heir apparent in September 2010. Kim Won-hong was appointed minister in April 2012 as the position was restored following Kim Jong-il's death. He served as Kim Jong-un's aide until February 2017 when he was allegedly dismissed for filing false reports to Kim Jong-un and mishandling an aide of Kim Jong-un. He was formally replaced in October 2017 at a WPK central committee plenum by Jong Kyong-thaek. So Tae-ha is the vice minister, while Kim Chang-sop serves as the head of the political department of the ministry.

On October 21, 2021, the MSS was instructed not to surveil North Koreans living near the Chinese-North Korean border who are known to be free from any ideological suspicions.

Duties
The Ministry of State Security is tasked to investigate political and economic crimes in North Korea, especially for the former on crimes against the Kim family. It's also tasked to conduct VIP protection duties for North Korean diplomats and employees who work in various North Korean embassies, consulates and other foreign missions abroad.

The Ministry is known to link up with various government ministries and agencies to help them with their various missions.

Agency directors

Ranks

Notes

References

Citations

Sources 

 

Communist repression
1973 establishments in North Korea
Law enforcement in North Korea
North Korean intelligence agencies
Protective security units
Secret police
Government agencies of North Korea